Julius Sergius von Klever (31 January 1850, Tartu - 24 December 1924, Leningrad) was a Baltic German landscape painter.

Biography 
His father was a chemist who taught pharmacology at the Veterinary Institute. He displayed artistic talent at an early age and took lessons from Konstantin von Kügelgen. After completing his primary education, was enrolled at the Imperial Academy of Fine Arts where, at his father's insistence, he studied architecture. After a short time, however, he began to take landscape painting classes; first with Sokrat Vorobiev, then Mikhail Clodt.

In 1870, he was apparently expelled from the Academy, for unknown reasons. Undeterred, he started exhibiting his works. In 1871, one was purchased by Count Pavel Stroganov and, the following year, his painting. "Sunset", was acquired by Grand Duchess Maria Nikolaevna. In 1874, he had his first solo exhibition at the Imperial Society for the Encouragement of the Arts. After Tsar Alexander II expressed interest in his work, he was named an "Artist" by the Academy, despite having not graduated. In 1878, he became an "Academician".

In 1879, he and the actor Vasily Samoylov (who was an amateur painter) spent some time working on Nargen island. The resulting works were purchased by Pavel Tretyakov and the Imperial Family, including Tsar Alexander III. Following this, the Academy named him a Professor. In 1885, he helped organize the Russian exhibit at the Exposition Universelle d'Anvers.

During this time, he was overwhelmed with orders and often completed a painting in a single day. He sometimes employed assistants to do the underpainting. Their identities and the extent of their contributions has not been fully established.

In the late 1890s, a friend of his from the Academy was implicated in a scandal involving gambling and embezzlement. He was drawn into it and suffered a nervous breakdown that forced him to give up painting temporarily. In 1908, he went to Germany with his family to avoid the situation and lived in Neustrelitz until 1915, when the war forced him to return home.

After the Revolution, he began receiving support from the "". For the rest of his life, he taught at the Academy (under its successive new Soviet names) and at the Art and Industry Academy, where he headed the department of "monumental" painting.

Three of his four children became painters; Maria (1878-1967) a theater artist, Julius (1882-1942) who taught at the Art and Industry Academy, and Oscar (1887-1975) a theater artist who also designed costumes.

The artist's legacy 
Von Klever's works are in the State Russian Museum, State Tretyakov Gallery, Odesa Fine Arts Museum, museums in Zaraisk, Barnaul, Vladimir, Volgograd, Kaluga, Kozmodemyansk, Kostroma, Krasnodar, Lipetsk, Veliky Novgorod, Sevastopol, Semey, Serpukhov, Stavropol, Syktyvkar, Tambov, Ulyanovsk, Almaty, Yerevan, Voronezh; in private collections.

The quick success of Von Klever gave him many orders. Sometimes creating a picture a day, Klever began to quickly brush over the underpainting, made by his assistants. This is how numerous works by "Von Klever and the Studio" appeared. The most famous of his collaborators was Prince Nikolai Obolensky. Count Muravyov was named among the successors of the Klever style in painting.

Selected paintings

References

Further reading 
 Valery Zhiglov, Художник Ю. Ю. Клевер (1850 – 1924), Litres, 2016 
• Alfried Nehring: JULIUS VON KLEVER Maler am Mare Baltikum [Bildbiografie] 2019(deutsch), Selbstverlag, in Leinen gebunden mit farbigem Schutzumschlag, 88 S., 112 farbige Abb., Format A4,

External links 

ArtNet: More works by Klever.
Julius von Klever @ Funeral-SPB.ru

1850 births
1924 deaths
People from Tartu
People from Kreis Dorpat
Baltic-German people
19th-century painters from the Russian Empire
Russian male painters
Russian landscape painters
20th-century Russian painters
19th-century male artists from the Russian Empire
20th-century Russian male artists